Tribochromism refers to a change in colour of a material caused by mechanical friction.

Tribochromatic materials are used when friction has to be detected.  These materials generally change colour under mechanical stress conditions and then the colour gradually fades once the stress is removed.

See also
 Triboluminescence – An optical phenomenon in which light is generated when material is subject to mechanical breaking, especially noticeable when crushing Wint-O-Green Life Savers in the dark.

Chromism